Anthoxanthum odoratum, known as sweet vernal grass, is a short-lived perennial grass that is native to acidic grassland in Eurasia and northern Africa. It is grown as a lawn grass and a house plant, due to its sweet scent, and can also be found on unimproved pastures and meadows. The specific epithet odoratum is Latin for 'odorous'.

Description
The lower lemmas have projecting awns.

The scent is particularly strong when dried, and is due to coumarin, a glycoside, and benzoic acid – it smells like fresh hay with a hint of vanilla. The seed head is bright yellow in color.

Anthoxanthum odoratum is experiencing parapatric speciation in areas of mine contamination.

Distribution
Anthoxanthum odoratum is native to Europe and temperate parts of Asia, but is widely introduced and naturalised so that distribution is now Circumpolar Wide-temperate. It is ubiquitous at the 10 km square level in Britain.

Cultivation
It is grown by scattering seed on tilled ground in the spring through fall, germinating in 4 to 5 days. It prefers sandy loam and acidic conditions (a low pH). As an agricultural grass it has a low yield, but can grow on land too acidic for other grasses.

Gallery

References

Further reading

External links

 Skye Flora

Pooideae
Flora of Africa
Flora of Europe
Flora of Asia
Taxa named by Carl Linnaeus